Maserati is Italian automobile manufacturer. 

It may also refer to:

People
 Maserati brothers, Italian automotive engineers
 Alfieri Maserati (1887–1932) 
 Bindo Maserati (1883–1980)
 Carlo Maserati (1881–1910)
 Ernesto Maserati (1898–1975)
 Ettore Maserati (1894–1990)
 Alessandro Maserati (born 1979), Italian pro cyclist
 Tony Maserati, U.S. music producer

Other uses
 Maserati (motorcycle), Italian motorcycle maker and automotive component manufacturer
 Maserati (band), U.S. rock band
 Trofeo Maserati (Maserati Trophy) single marque motorsport championship

See also

 Mazarati, a 1980s R&B band from Minneapolis